Josh Bullocks (born February 28, 1983) is an American football safety. He was drafted by the New Orleans Saints in the second round of the 2005 NFL Draft. He is the identical twin of fellow NFL safety Daniel Bullocks.

He played college football at Nebraska. Bullocks has also been a member of the Chicago Bears and Oakland Raiders. In January 2015, he joined the Omaha Beef of Champions Indoor Football as an assistant coach.

Early years
Bullocks attended Hixson High School in Chattanooga, Tennessee, along with his brother Daniel from 1997 to 2001. Josh and Daniel were both multi-sport standouts participating in track and field, as well as excelling in football. Josh played running back throughout his high school career while Daniel played quarterback. The Bullocks brothers led the Hixson Wildcats to four consecutive TSSAA football playoff appearances. Josh and Daniel were heavily recruited by several NCAA Division I schools including the University of Tennessee before deciding to attend the University of Nebraska–Lincoln. They graduated in 2001.

College career
Bullocks played college football at Nebraska, where he started 28 games in three seasons.  He had ten interceptions and 49 tackles in 2003, when he was a finalist to win the Jim Thorpe Award.

Professional career

New Orleans Saints
Bullocks was drafted by the New Orleans Saints and played four seasons with the team. During that time, he appeared in 62 games (49 starts) and recorded 256 tackles, one sack, six interceptions and 24 pass deflections.

Chicago Bears
An unrestricted free agent in the 2009 offseason, Bullocks signed a one-year contract with the Chicago Bears that included $525,000 in guaranteed money. The move put Bullocks in the same division as his twin brother, Daniel, who played for the Detroit Lions before being released in the 2010 offseason.

Oakland Raiders
The Raiders signed Bullocks on August 15, 2011, after Hiram Eugene suffered a serious hip injury in the pre-season opener. He was waived on August 30.

NFL statistics

Personal
Josh Bullocks is the identical twin brother of Daniel Bullocks, also a safety at the University of Nebraska, who was also drafted 40th overall when the Detroit Lions selected him in the 2006 NFL Draft. The two are cousins of U.S. Olympic gold medalist Evelyn Ashford.

Beginning in 2007, Bullocks and his brother have awarded a $5,000 scholarship to a Hixson High senior athlete. In order to be eligible the student must attend Hixson, be a senior, be an athlete, and write an essay.

References

External links
 Nebraska Cornhuskers profile

1983 births
Living people
American football safeties
Chicago Bears players
Nebraska Cornhuskers football players
New Orleans Saints players
Oakland Raiders players
Identical twins
Sportspeople from Chattanooga, Tennessee
Players of American football from Tennessee
American twins
Twin sportspeople